Admiral Sir Walter James Hunt-Grubbe  (23 February 1833 – 11 April 1922) was a Royal Navy officer who went on to be Commander-in-Chief, Cape of Good Hope Station.

Naval career
Hunt-Grubbe joined the Royal Navy in 1845. Promoted to Captain in 1866, he was given command of HMS Tamar and the men of the naval brigade at the Battle of Amoaful during the Anglo-Ashanti wars. He went on to command HMS Rupert, HMS Devastation and then HMS Pembroke in which capacity he was in charge of the Medway Steam Reserve. Later he commanded HMS Sultan. He was appointed Commander-in-Chief, Cape of Good Hope and West Coast of Africa Station in 1885 and Superintendent of Devonport dockyard in 1888. He went on to be President of the Royal Naval College, Greenwich, in 1894.

In retirement he became deputy chairman of the committee established in 1898 to provide for the efficient organisation and management of the London School of Hygiene & Tropical Medicine. He was appointed Knight Grand Cross of the Order of the Bath in the 1899 Birthday Honours.

Family
In 1867 he married Mary Anne Codrington.

References

|-

1833 births
1922 deaths
Admiral presidents of the Royal Naval College, Greenwich
Royal Navy admirals
Knights Grand Cross of the Order of the Bath